Sumin  is a village in the administrative district of Gmina Tarnawatka, within Tomaszów Lubelski County, Lublin Voivodeship, in eastern Poland.

The village has a population of 222.

References

Villages in Tomaszów Lubelski County